A visual pun is a pun involving an image or images (in addition to or instead of language), often based on a rebus.

Visual puns in which the image is at odds with the inscription are common in cartoons such as Lost Consonants or The Far Side as well as in Dutch gable stones.

European heraldry contains the technique of canting arms, which can be considered punning.

Visual puns in heraldry 

Visual puns on the bearer's name are used extensively as forms of heraldic expression, they are called canting arms. They have been used for centuries across Europe and have even been used recently by members of the British royal family, such as on the arms of Queen Elizabeth, the Queen Mother and of Princess Beatrice of York. The arms of U.S. Presidents Theodore Roosevelt and Dwight D. Eisenhower are also canting.

Gallery

See also 
 Japanese rebus monogram
 Slapstick

Further reading
 Christian Hempelmann and Andrea C. Samson. “Visual Puns and Verbal Puns: Descriptive Analogy or False Analogy?” In: Diana Popa and Salvatore Attardo (Eds.), “New Approaches to the Linguistics of Humor.” Galati: Dunarea de Jos. 2007. 180-196.

References 

Humour
Puns